Duff Hill at , is the 78th-highest peak in Ireland on the Arderin scale, and the 97th-highest peak on the Vandeleur-Lynam scale. Duff Hill is in the middle section of the Wicklow Mountains, in Wicklow, Ireland, and is part of the large massif of Mullaghcleevaun , which lies to its south.

Bibliography

See also

Wicklow Way
Wicklow Mountains
Lists of mountains in Ireland
List of mountains of the British Isles by height
List of Hewitt mountains in England, Wales and Ireland

References

External links
MountainViews: The Irish Mountain Website, Duff Hill
MountainViews: Irish Online Mountain Database
The Database of British and Irish Hills , the largest database of British Isles mountains ("DoBIH")
Hill Bagging UK & Ireland, the searchable interface for the DoBIH

Mountains and hills of County Wicklow
Hewitts of Ireland
Mountains under 1000 metres